The Roman Catholic Diocese of Manono is a diocese located in the city of Manono  in the Ecclesiastical province of Lubumbashi in the Democratic Republic of the Congo.

History
 April 24, 1971: Established as Diocese of Manono from the Diocese of Baudouinville, Diocese of Kilwa and Diocese of Kongolo

Leadership
 Bishops of Manono (Latin Rite), in reverse chronological order
 Bishop Vincent de Paul Kwanga Njubu (since 2005.03.18)
 Bishop Nestor Ngoy Katahwa (1989.09.25 – 2000.11.16), appointed Bishop of Kolwezi
 Bishop Gérard Ngoy Kabwe (1972.05.06 – 1989.09.25)

See also
Roman Catholicism in the Democratic Republic of the Congo

Sources
 GCatholic.org
 Catholic Hierarchy

Roman Catholic dioceses in the Democratic Republic of the Congo
Christian organizations established in 1971
Roman Catholic dioceses and prelatures established in the 20th century
Roman Catholic Ecclesiastical Province of Lubumbashi